Haripur is a township in Kangra district in the Indian state of Himachal Pradesh.  Haripur Guler are twin townships carrying the heritage of Guler Riyasat. A river separates the two towns which further makes Pong wetland, a Ramsar Wetalnd Site, home to a large number of migratory birds in winters because of marshes and the presence of irrigated private land.

On the other side of Haripur town, is Guler which has a narrow gauge railway station connected from Pathankot station to Jogindernagar station. Formerly very prosperous and having a pool of talent, the township is now not able to provide jobs to its youngsters, forcing them to leave or to seek some informal job. The area can become a pool of the jobs if state and centre authorities will look into the potential of the area and its socio-cultural importance.

History 

Guler State was a historical princely state in the area between 1405, when the state was founded, and 1813 when it was annexed by Punjab.

Guler State was famous as the cradle of the Kangra paintings. Guler painting is the early phase of Kangra Kalam.  About the middle of the eighteenth century some Hindu artists trained in Mughal style sought the patronage of the Rajas of Guler in the Kangra Valley.  There they developed a style of painting which has a delicacy and a spirituality of feeling.  The Guler artists had the colors of the dawn and the rainbow on their palette.

On the hills of Haripur, there is a ruined fort which was built by Raja Hari Chand, which is the second fort built by him after Kangra (Nagarkot) Fort. The caves and some temples built by the king are still there, of great heritage and cultural importance, left at the mercy of the elements which are damaging them like the damaged road of the area in the periphery.

Geography
It has an average elevation of 551 metres (1811 feet).

Demographics 

It has an average population of approximate 3000 peoples.

References

Cities and towns in Kangra district
Hill stations in Himachal Pradesh